Jerry Kenneth Swilling (born September 25, 1970) is a former college and professional American football player who played Defensive Back for one season for the Cleveland Browns.  Ken played high school football at Stephens County and college football at Georgia Tech.

Georgia Tech
Swilling played Defensive Back for the Yellow Jackets from 1988 through 1991.  He was an All-American and member of the 1990 National Championship team.  Ken had a nickname of "Captain America" while at Tech.  "If you were to draw a picture of a football player in a uniform, you'd draw Ken Swilling," said Coach Bobby Ross in a Sports Illustrated interview; "He's the guy you want to get off the bus first when you go visiting." Swilling is said to have called an undefeated season during before the 1990 schedule began after supposedly having a dream that it would happen.

Records and accomplishments
1990 National Championship Team
1990 AP All-American
1989 and 1990 All-ACC
ACC 50th Anniversary Team

References

1970 births
Living people
All-American college football players
American football safeties
Cleveland Browns players
Georgia Tech Yellow Jackets football players
Players of American football from Georgia (U.S. state)
People from Toccoa, Georgia